Lebret may refer to:

 Lebret, Saskatchewan, a village in Canada
 Évelyne Lebret (born 1938), French sprinter
 Jacques Lebret (d. 1645), French clergyman
 Louis-Joseph Lebret (1897–1966), French scientist

See also 
 Cardin Le Bret (1558–1655), French jurist
 Jean Le Bret (1872–1947), French sailor at the 1900 Summer Olympics
 Labret, a body piercing